Big Ghost is an anonymous online personality, hip hop writer and blogger, and music producer.  He was once best known for his witty writing style and satirical humor on his earlier hip hop album reviews and blog posts.

History 

Big Ghost began as a parody of Wu Tang Clan's Ghostface Killah, which many believed to be Ghostface himself.

He was interviewed by various online magazines including GQ, Genius, and Complex and later began writing for and collaborating with major blogs and websites such as Okayplayer and the Genius website.

Controversy 
In early March 2011, rapper Wiz Khalifa publicly went on the air during an interview on The Star & Bucwild Morning Show, and made remarks about rapper Ghostface Killah, saying that he was "corny", for allegedly commenting on Wiz's latest single "Roll Up" on his blog, further stating, "Him saying corny stuff makes him a corny individual".

The real Ghostface quickly responded stating it was not him, tweeting "tell the kid Wiz, its all love i respect him as a artist and got no issues wit him at all, Once again the website is fake, its not ya boy!", then later tweeting again, reaffirming that he had no affiliation with the blogger.

On 3 March 2011, legal action was taken by Wu Tang Corporate to shut the blog site down due to infringement violations but was later made operational once again.

Music production 
In late 2015, Big Ghost branched out into music production, releasing a free project with production being credited solely to Big Ghost Ltd. It has never been made publicly clear whether Big Ghost Ltd itself is a solo venture or a team of collaborating producers, although a Hector Puente Colon Jr. & The Santiago Men's Basketball Philharmonic Orchestra has been attributed to the instrumentation on all albums. The first release under the Big Ghost Ltd name, was a collaborative project with Buffalo rappers Westside Gunn and Conway, entitled Griselda Ghost, released on 11 September 2015. On 5 October 2018, Big Ghost Ltd. was given full production credit on Ghostface Killah's latest project called The Lost Tapes.

Discography

Albums / EP's

Singles

Remixes

Instrumental Albums

Mixtapes

References

External links 
 https://open.spotify.com/playlist/1AQu3J7pbgwjDFaidfvkp0

Living people
Year of birth missing (living people)
Place of birth missing (living people)
Anonymous bloggers
Hip hop record producers